Simply Carrie is the debut album by Carrie Lucas. Released in 1977 on the Soul Train Records label.

Track listing
"I Gotta Keep Dancin'"
"Me for You"
"Play by Your Rule"
"Tender"
"Jammin' Tenderly (Tender, Pt. 2)"
"I Gotta Get Away from Your Love"
"I'll Close Love's Door"
"What's the Question"
"Men Kiss and Tell"

Album

Singles

References

1977 debut albums
Carrie Lucas albums